() is Korean for chili pepper.

"" may also refer more specifically to:
 Korean chili pepper
 Cheongyang chili pepper
 Cucumber chili pepper